Kenneth Robert "Kenny" Vasoli is an American singer and musician from Pennsylvania. Vasoli is currently the lead singer and songwriter of The Starting Line, Person L, and Vacationer.

Biography
Kenneth "Kenny" Robert Vasoli was born May 20, 1984 in Abington, Pennsylvania, and attended Hatboro-Horsham High School. At the age of 14, Vasoli was invited to join the pop punk band The Starting Line after Matt Watts read his AOL Messenger profile. Vasoli finished high school early at the age of 17 to concentrate on music, and was 18 years old upon release of The Starting Line's debut album Say It Like You Mean It in 2002. Vasoli was a member of the bands The Prize Fight and Smash Adams, and in early 2004 also had a short-lived side-project called Statue with members of The Prize Fight and Inkling.

In 2006, Vasoli formed the band Person L as an outlet to explore other musical styles different from The Starting Line. Person L was just a side project when The Starting Line’s third and final album "Direction" (2007) was being recorded. As Vasoli puts it, his new band was a way to get his “weird-ies” out. But after "Direction” it became his full-time creative focus, as he felt in some ways spent with his original band. "I probably was the leader in us cooling down. I think I had probably reached a point where I felt a little bit tapped creatively to write for that band," Vasoli said.

"Life is short dude," Vasoli said, speaking about his ever-changing creative outlets. "If I'm given the opportunity to be in the driver's seat, I don't want to paint myself into a corner of being trapped in these same 20 songs for my whole life."

Since 2010, Vasoli formed psychedelic pop band Vacationer and released four records: Gone (2012), Relief (2014), Mindset (2018), and Wavelengths (2019).

Discography
 With The Starting Line
 Say It Like You Mean It (2002)
 Based on a True Story (2005)
 Direction (2007)

 With Person L
 Initial (2008)
 The Positives (2009)

 With Vacationer
 Gone (2012)
 Relief (2014)
 Mindset (2018)
 Wavelengths (2019)

References

1984 births
Living people
American rock bass guitarists
American male bass guitarists
American people of Italian descent
American rock singers
Singers from Pennsylvania
Guitarists from Philadelphia
21st-century American singers
21st-century American bass guitarists
21st-century American male singers